"Dark Nights: Death Metal" is a 2020–2021 comic book storyline published by DC Comics, consisting of an eponymous central miniseries by writer Scott Snyder and artist Greg Capullo, and a number of tie-in books. The seven-issue miniseries was released from June 16, 2020, to January 5, 2021. The crossover was received with acclaim, with critics praising the unique plot, the art, the action, and the ending. It serves as the conclusion of the five-year spanning Dark Multiverse Saga.

Publication history
"Dark Nights: Death Metal" is the sequel to 2017's "Dark Nights: Metal" and concludes Scott Snyder's run in DC Comics; he stated "Everything is coming back, we want to pay it forward. The Omega Titans, Barbatos, the Forge, it’s all coming back. Everything you read, our goal is to reward. All of it culminates in like a year in like a "Metal" event." "Death Metal" not only concludes the three-year spanning Dark Multiverse narrative that began with "Dark Nights: Metal", but will bring an end to the New 52 and DC Rebirth continuities that began with 2011's "Flashpoint" storyline.

In April 2020 during an interview on DC Daily, Snyder assured that the purpose of "Death Metal" is to unify every storyline from mainline DC Universe comic books, including the standalone stories.

The series was set to launch on May 13, 2020, but was rescheduled to June 16 due to the COVID-19 pandemic.

Background
Following the final battle between Batman and the Batman Who Laughs, the Source Wall is shattered, causing a chain of events that frees Perpetua from her cosmic prison. Despite Apex Lex capturing the Batman Who Laughs, the latter reveals that the future Lex saw was a hoax made by Perpetua in order to manipulate him. After this revelation, Perpetua strips Lex of his powers and returns him to Earth. She starts to get the inhabitants of some of the Earths on her side, like the Crime Syndicate of America of the revived Earth 3.

Meanwhile, the Justice League survived their battle with Perpetua after they were saved by the Quintessence, who reveal they were protecting something very important. The Quintessence then sent the League to an unknown location in order to search for it.

Somewhere, Tempus Fuginaut revised several Earths from the Dark Multiverse and then recruits Wally West to access Metron's Mobius Chair (which is upgraded with Doctor Manhattan's powers) and restore the balance between the Light and Dark Multiverses. This action causes Wally to assume a new persona and, with his new powers, he wants to mend all of reality into one single timeline, but the presence of the Batman Who Laughs prevents that from happening.

Plot

Issue #1
The goddess Perpetua has taken over Prime Earth and is in the process of destroying all realities (of the 52 local universes, only eight are left) so that she can restart the Multiverse in her image. Her lieutenant, the Batman Who Laughs, aided by an army of evil Batmen from the Dark Multiverse, enforce her rule. All resistance has been crushed and even Earth's heroes have been press-ganged into servitude. But when a mysterious prisoner is to be banished to Tartarus Pits of Hell (formerly Themyscira), he awakens memories in Warden Wonder Woman. When a meeting with the Batman Who Laughs's Justice League (Harley Quinn, Aquaman, Wonder Woman, and Mister Miracle; each paired with a respective Dark Knight of the Dark Multiverse) is interrupted by the main Batman, Wonder Woman argues with her former teammate, saying that it is not enough to just win small "street battles" like Bruce but that they need to fix everything and not just what is left. Meanwhile, out in space, the bounty hunter Lobo is hired to uncover something. Back in the Tartarus Pits, Diana meets up with the prisoner, revealed to be an exhausted Wally West, who retells Diana the story of Perpetua, how she has manipulated many of the previous Crises from behind the scenes, and how she survived the previous battle with the Justice League through the Batman Who Laughs. When the Amazon decides the best cause of action is to make the first Anti-Crisis, she is confronted by the Batman Who Laughs, whom she proceeds to gut with an invisible Chainsaw of Truth. Though dead, the Dark Knights work to unleash the Batman Who Laughs' true plan of preparing the body of the final Bruce Wayne. In an underground bunker, Batman enlists the help of a severed Sgt. Rock.

Issue #2
In the Hellscape (outside of what used to be Washington, D.C.), Wonder Woman, Wally West and Swamp Thing drive the hijacked Batmobeast where they run over the Batom (a Batman/Atom hybrid). They gain access to the Valhalla Cemetery, a secret Crypt of Heroes that is currently guarded by the surviving members of the JSA: Alan Scott, Jay Garrick, Doctor Fate and Wildcat. The password the three of them used to get in was 'Ma Hunkel' who was the guardian of the first JSA headquarters. Batman and Jonah Hex are also there and in the process of conscripting an army out of tombs in the crypt. The heroes buried there are the Atom, the Black Condor, the Dove, the Human Bomb, Johnny Quick, the Liberty Belle, the Phantom Lady, the original Sandman and Uncle Sam. The former disapproves of Diana's killing of the Batman Who Laughs (as the villain will just evolve into a new nightmare), saying how they needed to fight small but Diana says she could not live with that. Bruce plans to use this army to take Castle Bat and forge a new Earth in the dark, saving only those who they can. Diana tries to persuade Bruce to join her in creating a new Multiverse but he refuses to listen as he blames himself for everything that has happened and thinks Diana will make the same mistakes he did. Diana's plan is to travel to the Dark Multiverse and to the original Crises, steal the energy taken by Perpetua and give it to Wally to not only defeat Perpetua but also restart the Multiverse. Jay calls in Barry Allen (who has been unable to fix things with the Speed Force, as there is no way out of the present), and together with Diana and Bruce, plan to travel to New Apokolips to save their friends. Meanwhile, at Castle Bat, the Dark Knights succeed in transferring the Batman Who Laughs' brain into an energy construct based on Doctor Manhattan's powers, an action that might have repercussions if Perpetua were to find out. At this point Perpetua is ravishing Earth-30 and warns the Batman Who Laughs of the beings like her who may sense her actions (worried they might destroy her). The Batman Who Laughs proceeds to wipe out the remaining Dark Knights with the exception of one Robin, who he decides to make his "Robin King"; he then shifts into a new form ("the Darkest Knight") exclaiming that he knows Diana plans to remake the Multiverse while he wants to make "52 Planets of Nightmares". In the Arkham Wastes, Diana, Bruce, Barry, Jonah Hex and Harley enter the workshop of the Toymaster to use his new stealth ship designed as a composite version of Superman, Batman, and Wonder Woman to head to New Apokolips.

Legends of the Dark Knights
Prior to events, the Batman Who Laughs recruited five new Dark Knight members:

 The Robin King, a psychotic child version of Bruce Wayne who kills anyone, even his own family, to get what he wants.
 Batmansaurus Rex, a Batman who turned his body into a robot dinosaur.
 Castle Bat, a Batman who killed his son as part of a ritual to transfer his soul into Gotham City.
 Batmobeast, a Batman who transferred his soul into a cybernetic vehicle.
 Baby Batman, a Batman who made himself a cloned body in order to still live but who was reborn prematurely.

In the middle of this, the Batman Who Laughs discovers the existence of Batmanhattan (the "final" Bruce Wayne), who replicated the formula of Doctor Manhattan's powers. The Batman Who Laughs incapacitated Manhattan to access his body and transform into the Darkest Knight.

Issue #3
On New Apokolips (the prison of the remaining DC heroes, inside the heart of a dying sun), Wonder Woman's team combat an army of Para-Robins (a hybrid of Parademons and different Robins). The planet is now run by a Batman who took the powers of Darkseid, a "Darkfather" who is currently torturing Superman with a new inescapable Murder Machine designed by the captive Mister Miracle which emits different forms of Kryptonite from the Dark Multiverse. When the heroes attack, Batman must find a way to get Superman out of the machine without it unleashing Anti-Life on the Kryptonian. However, when Darkfather decides to shoot Batman with the same gun he used on Darkseid in Final Crisis (which he has modified to erase Batman from history), the demonic tyrant is surprised to find it does not work for reasons only Superman seems to know. Superman breaks free of the machine with Batman's Black Lantern Ring protecting him and punches the Darkfather into space. Breaking the remaining heroes out of the super-prison, Diana reveals the scope of her plan to save all reality. They have come for Jarro, the baby Starro that is possibly the most powerful psychic being in the universe, to keep the heroes from being detected by the Dark Knights. With his help, Superman, Batman and Wonder Woman will re-enter the Dark Multiverse to acquire the energy needed to restart the Multiverse. Meanwhile, the Darkest Knight and the Robin King break into Valhalla Cemetery. Knowing that they are after Wally's power, Jay Garrick, Barry Allen, and Wally West run with the Darkest Knight giving chase. In the Fifth Dimension, Lobo acquires the fifth and final box of "Death Metal" needed for his employer Lex Luthor who is planning to begin work to "change the story of this universe, once and for all".

Dark Nights: Death Metal Guidebook
Lex Luthor narrates how Earth was invaded by armies of Dark Knights, led by the Batman Who Laughs, leaving catastrophic consequences in the process. The irradiated western coast of the United States split off and became the Arkham Wastelands where Harley Quinn rules under Doctor Arkham. The east coast is turned into Megapokalips by Darkfather's technology since it also contains Metropolis and various rings of the different Lantern Corps. Gotham City split off into its own continent where it replaces Canada and contains The Batman Who Laugh's headquarters, Castle Bat. Themyscira is transformed into the new Hell where Wonder Woman became the warden who guards the prisoners there and Gemworld became part of the transformed Themyscira. Skartaris became a frozen land where it appears in place of Mexico. The Rock of Eternity fell into Fawcett City enough to free the Seven Deadly Enemies of Man. Aquaman was given control of Earth's oceans ruling under Bathomet and the mechanical Black Fleet. Lex also hired Lobo to help him rescue the Legion of Doom.

Trinity Crisis
Superman, Batman and Wonder Woman travel back to the times of the three great Crises to stop Perpetua's attempts to manipulate those events. As they travel, they encounter Barbatos who taunts them with the idea that each Crisis is an example of how they failed rather than how they succeeded as things became so bad that a Crisis was the only option. The trinity reject that idea and continue to each Crisis - Batman visiting the original Crisis, Wonder Woman visiting the Infinite Crisis, and Superman visiting the Final Crisis - but they emerge to be confronted by a victorious Anti-Monitor, Superboy-Prime, and Darkseid, respectively. Superboy-Prime taunts Wonder Woman that Perpetua has already changed the outcome of these events.

"Doom Metal Part 1"
Nightwing, along with a band of allies, including Hawkgirl and a reluctant Detective Chimp, are tasked by Lex Luthor to rescue the Legion of Doom.

Speed Metal
Barry, Wally, and Jay team up with Kid Flash and the rest of the Flash family to outrun the Darkest Knight and his army of Dark Multiverse Flashes in order to reach the Mobius Chair.

Multiverse's End
The Green Lantern Corps and the Justice Incarnate have united against the remaining Earths that have sworn loyalty to Perpetua: Earth 3, Earth 10, Earth 29, Earth 43, and Earth 50. All the while, John Stewart tries to convince a reluctant Owlman to betray Perpetua and rise up against the destruction of the Multiverse. He does so and uses a special gun made on Qward to kill Ultraman and Superwoman.

Issue #4
Superman, Batman, and Wonder Woman are trapped in Dark versions of the original Crisis Trilogy where the main villains have won. Batman is trying to console the Anti-Monitor (only to be unmade by him). Superman is being trampled by the corrupted Supermen of the Multiverse as Darkseid plans to finally turn Superman into his acolyte. Across the land of Gotham, the Flash family are burning up the Speed Force to outpace the Darkest Knight. Wally contacts Jarro, who is trying to stop Harley from killing the Robin King after the evil Boy Wonder murdered Hex. Instead, the Swamp Thing decides to drop the cavern on him. Meanwhile, Wonder Woman learns how Superboy-Prime killed Alexander Luthor Jr. as he served no purpose in this "world of hope" after bargaining with the Batman Who Laughs. He holds Diana responsible for everything. In leaving Wally exposed and sending the Lanterns to destroy the antennas across the Multiverse while redirecting the Crisis area to one she is trapped in, she has given the Darkest Knight everything he needs. And now Superboy-Prime stands to direct all Crisis energy to his new master. Diana begs Superboy-Prime to reconsider; imploring that change is constant, and that in the end there is room for all universes. Superboy-Prime shatters the Crisis worlds, saving Batman and Superman in the process, and directs all energy to Wally. However, it does not work. Before they had a chance, the Darkest Knight rigged the Mobius Chair so it would always direct the power to himself. And now he has everything he needs to remake the Multiverse in his own image called the Last 52.

"Doom Metal Part 2"
Starfire and Cyborg are fresh from their return to Earth and team up with Nightwing's gang where they come face-to-face with a valley of Starros. Meanwhile, the Martian Manhunter matches wits with the Dark Knight equivalent of himself called the Mindhunter.

"Doom Metal Part 3"
Lex Luthor and Nightwing help the others escape the valley which is revealed to be one big giant Starro. Lex has constructed a vessel (which he names after Lana Lang) to continue the journey to Brimstone Bay. However Detective Chimp is disheartened by the whole experience and Hawkgirl is more prioritized with saving Martian Manhunter.

Robin King
The Robin King tells his story of how the Batman Who Laughs recruited him into his Robins army. When the Robin King defeats his opponents, the Red Tornado, Animal Man, and the Blue Beetle arrived at the scene where the Robin King took down the superheroes. During their fight with the Robin King, the Red Tornado is sprayed with a Mortal Coil chemical that causes him to spin out of control. Then, the Robin King summoned Anti-Living versions of Animal Man's family, who start to eat him. The Mortal Coil then causes the Red Tornado to become human and rip apart as a shrapnel from the outcome kills Animal Man. Then, the Robin King unleashed a giant beetle on the Blue Beetle, which killed him. In a back-up story, the Signal along with the Spoiler, the Orphan, and the Red Robin battle against Quietus (a Dark Knight that is a fusion of Batman, Ra's al Ghul, and Duke Thomas).

Rise of the New God
A being called Chronicler first views the DC Universe (through the eyes of the Psycho-Pirate and Vril Dox) while also resurrecting the New God Metron. In a back-up story spinning out of the events of "Multiverse's End", John Stewart thinks about recruiting more members into the Green Lantern Corps.

"Doom Metal Part 4"
Perpetua's Omega Knight is about to deal the final blow to Nightwing's team when Detective Chimp comes to the rescue (finally breaking out of his stupor), while Hawkgirl saves J'onn from the Mindhunter. Regrouped, the team work together to both distract the Omega Knight and destroy the throne tower holding the Legion of Doom captive.

Infinite Hour Exxxtreme!
Lobo narrates his perspective on how Lex Luthor hired him to receive the Death Metal while on the run from a Batman/Lobo mashup known as The Batman Who Frags.

"Doom Metal Part 5"
The crew finally frees the Legion of Doom and defeats the Omega Knight. Soon afterward, they then join the other heroes in their fight against the Darkest Knight.

Issue #5
With his new god-like powers, the Darkest Knight orders Castle Bat (which turns into a colossal Batman) to attack the heroes. The heroes stand no chance against the giant whose structure is made of every material in Kane County. However, the monster is finally shot down by the Hall of Doom, piloted by Lex Luthor himself. As the battle between the Darkest Knight and Perpetua begins following her attack on Earth-49, Lex Luthor reveals to the heroes the Death Metal (shards of Element X/Tenth Metal that the Monitor locked away after the events of Dark Nights: Metal) and how he has been making a machine that could to peer into the heart of reality. With this machine, they can remove the knots of the DC Timeline, unlocking all lost memories of the DC Universe, giving them the Anti-Crisis energy needed to fight the Darkest Knight. When faced with truth, Wonder Woman realizes that she caused the Justice League to fail against Perpetua due to her hesitating, Batman confesses that he's been dead all this time (explaining his use of the Black Lantern Ring), and Superman knows that there's no stopping his transformation into Darkseid. Despite this, the World's Finest are ready to fight alongside Wonder Woman one last time. While Wonder Woman leads an army of Lobos (cloned from Lobo's regenerative blood) into the Rock of Eternity, Superman frees the villains locked away (consisting of Captain Cold, Clayface, Clock King II, Cyborg Superman, Giganta, Granny Goodness, Joker, Killer Croc, Mr. Freeze, Parasite, Penguin, Riddler, and Solomon Grundy) and recruits the remaining Supermen (consisting of Bizarro of Earth-29, Superboy-Prime), Lantern Corps (consisting of Sinestro, Star Sapphire, and Atrocitus), and Black Adam to destabilize the Prime Earth (the center of the Multiverse), effectively stopping the Darkest Knight from drawing anymore Crisis Energy. While giving Wonder Woman a journal that was written by Carter Hall, Lex states that he is too weak to help her out. Noticing this, the Darkest Knight (unable to get free of Perpetua) sends his evil Earths out to kill the united army of heroes and villains. In addition to the heroes and villains present, Batman uses the Black Lantern rings to revive Air Wave, Animal Man, Anthro, Atom, Bat Lash, Black Condor, Blue Beetle, Claw the Unconquered, Dan the Dyna-Mite, Dove I, Enemy Ace, Fate, Hawk II, Hourman, Human Bomb, Johnny Quick, Liberty Belle, Red Bee, both Red Tornadoes, Sandman, and TNT as well as Crime Syndicate of America members Ultraman and Johnny Quick. Everyone living, dead, or unliving is ready for the final battle as they will fight until there is no tomorrow.

The Multiverse Who Laughs
The Robin King tells stories in the New Dark Multiverse to the Groblins:

 Zsasz in "Feeding the Beast" -
 The Super-Pets in "The Super-Threats" -
 Green Arrow and Green Lantern in "Hard-Traveled" -
 Steel in "The Fear Index" -

The Last Stories of the DC Universe
The heroes of the DC Universe spend their last moments together before they prepare for their final battle against The Batman Who Laughs and his new Dark Multiverse:

 The Titans in "Together Pt. 1" -
 Green Lantern in "Last Knights" -
 Wonder Woman in "The Question" -
 Green Arrow and Black Canary in "Dust of a Distant Storm" -
 Aquaman in "Whale Fall" -
 The Bat-Family in "We Fight for Love" -
 Superman in "Man of Tomorrow" -
 The Titans in "Together Pt. 2" -

Issue #6
Earth's last line of defense face off against the monsters of the Darkest Knight's "Last 52" Earths; Batman even makes the original body of the Batman Who Laughs fight by their side with his Black Lantern Ring. Meanwhile, the battle between Perpetua and the Darkest Knight rages as the celestial being chastises the former Dark Knight by claiming she's the only one protecting the Multiverse from detection from her kind. The Darkest Knight proceeds to trap Perpetua in the fragments of the Source Wall that originally held her and killed her. Realigning the Prime Earth so the Crisis Energy continues to empower him, he sends his "favorite soldiers" to attack Earth's heroes in their last moments while also reviving Devastator, Drowned, Merciless, Murder Machine and Red Death. In the passage to the World Forge, Wonder Woman's army of Lobo clones is being attacked by souls created by the Batman Who Laughs which take the journal of Carter Hall from her. Diana falls into the World Forge where she's confronted by Darkseid and the baby Anti-Monitor. Refusing to believe Darkseid's claims that humanity doesn't want to know the truth, Diana comes to realize how to make Luthor's machine and starts by dipping her Lasso of Truth into the World Forge. As the heroes stand as one universe against the horde of the Darkest Knight, they start remembering their entire history (including their various deaths and revivals) as a golden-clad Wonder Woman erupts from the ground to confront the Darkest Knight.

The Secret Origin 
Remembering his past with his beloved Laurie and his run-ins with the Superman Family and his changing throughout the Crisis, Superboy-Prime takes his anger out on the Darkest Knight. The Darkest Knight offers to bring back Superboy-Prime's Earth, but is felled by a powerful onslaught of punches. The resulting explosion kills Superboy-Prime, who wakes up back in his world reading about this very story. Laurie visits him and they go for a walk. Superboy-Prime saves a kid from getting hit by a car, revealing he still has his powers.

The Last 52: War of the Multiverses 
The final battle rages on:

 Fight - Wonder Woman faces off against the Darkest Knight.
 First & Last Men - The Superman Family and their enemies battle with the "Superiors of the Ancient House of El" (consisting of the Last Sun, the Saint, the Savior, and the Shepherd).
 The Batmen Who Laugh - Batman finds himself under attack by the corpse of the Batman Who Laughs.
 Unstable Atoms - Ryan Choi overcomes his own shortcomings to help Mister Terrific and Will Magnus remake the Metal Men.
 No More Superheroes - Lois Lane comes face-to-face her own dark counterpart.
 Falling Through the Cracks - Raven saves the Teen Titans from her own evil counterpart.
 Apicus - The Penguin undergoes a hideous transformation.
 Armageddon Blues - Two John Constantines have one last drink before the end.
 Reign of the Swamp King - The Swamp Thing, Frankenstein, Anton Arcane, Brimstone, and Solomon Grundy battle the Swamp King.

Issue #7
A final battle clashes between the golden-clad Wonder Woman and the Darkest Knight; a battle that spans time and space. She is finally brought to the birth of creation where the Darkest Knight reveals that Perpetua's people (referred to as "the Hands") will simply erase the universe and without a restart, half of Diana's friends will be dead. Diana has two choices: keep fighting and lose or surrender to the Darkest Knight and use their combined power to kill the Hands. Refusing to give up, Diana strikes back at the Darkest Knight, pushing him forward through time, sending him into the dying embers of Earth's sun. Seeing the Hands arrive and her friends struggle like Batman resurrecting his Bat-Family and Foes against the Robin King where B-Rex and Batmager were resurrected and Lex sacrificing himself to save Superman from the evil Last Sun, Diana imagines the Universe young and alive again and shoves the Darkest Knight into an enormous red sun which was earlier described as the Death Sun and the end of all things. This kills the Darkest Knight. Awakening in a white void, she meets one of the Hands in the form of her Golden Age counterpart, telling her that her actions have allowed them to rethink their methods and that the Multiverse shall be restored with all history and all stories restored, as there is no place for walls and boundaries. All of this comes at the cost of Diana ascending to help the Hands from any looming threat. On Earth, the Hall of Justice hosts a massive party where every hero and villain who helped in the battle is celebrating. Barry reveals to Wally a new space station called "the Totality", a shield protecting the world from future threats consisting of the greatest minds on Earth (both heroes and villains). New futures are opening up, many fallen characters are returning and Darkseid is gone, the Infinite Multiverse is back (or as Lex calls it, an "Omniverse") which is an Infinite Frontier of possibilities. Even Prime Earth is no longer the centre of the Multiverse, as there are two sources of energy for the Multiverse (one might be on Earth, an "Elseworld"). In 1941, Sgt. Rock finishes writing his experience in Carter Hall's journal as he leads the Justice Society of America into battle.

Titles involved

Prelude issues

Main issues

Soundtrack
The announcement  trailer featured the song "Warship My Wreck" by Marilyn Manson, alongside an original song titled "Broken Dreams, Inc." by Rise Against. Other singles since released include Maria Brink and Andy Biersack's "Meet Me in the Fire", Chelsea Wolfe's "Diana", Denzel Curry and PlayThatBoiZay's "Bad Luck", Manchester Orchestra's "Never Ending", Health's "Anti-Life" featuring Chino Moreno, and Idles' "Sodium". The soundtrack was ranked number twenty on Revolvers list of the "25 Best Albums of 2021".

Critical reception 
At the review aggregator website Comic Book Roundup, the central miniseries garnered a score of 8.5 out of 10 based on 143 reviews.

Future
The aftermath of Dark Nights: Death Metal led to several titles:

 Generations: Shattered and Generations: Forged — Released in January and February 2021.
 Future State — Released between January and March 2021.
 Infinite Frontier — Released in March 2021.

Collected editions

References

DC Comics titles
2020 comics debuts
Comics by Scott Snyder